Matthew Wade was an Irish soldier and commander. In 1806 he was in charge of fortress "Civitella" in Abruzzo, against Joachim Murat's French siege. Despite being just 300 defenders, the French were held off from 27 March to 21 May, when they were forced to surrender and taken prisoner.

Matthew Wade is commemorated with a monumental tomb in Civitella, erected in 1829.

See also
Napoleonic Wars

References

Irish expatriates in Italy
Wild Geese (soldiers)
Irish diaspora in Europe
Irish soldiers in Italy
Year of birth missing
Year of death missing
19th-century Irish people